is a Japanese politician of the Democratic Party of Japan, a member of the House of Councillors in the Diet (national legislature). A native of Takayama, Gifu, he was elected for the first time in 2004.

References

External links 
 Official website in Japanese.

Members of the House of Councillors (Japan)
Living people
1952 births
Democratic Party of Japan politicians